WTKP (93.5 FM) is a commercial radio station located in Port St. Joe, Florida broadcasting in the Panama City area on 93.5 FM.

History
WTKP was formerly licensed to Mexico Beach, Florida at 99.3 FM. On May 3, 2007, the station started a simulcast of WEBZ. On May 14, 2007, a call sign change was approved by the FCC moving the WPBH call-sign from 99.3 FM to 93.5 FM. On September 7, 2007, the station changed format to classic rock as "Rock 93.5".

On January 25, 2008, it was announced that the then-WPBH was one of several Clear Channel radio stations to be sold, in order to remain under the ownership caps following the sale of Clear Channel to private investors. Until it was sold, WPBH and other stations to be sold were placed into the Aloha Station Trust.

The station was sold to Omni Broadcasting LLC on May 15, 2012, for a price of $135,000.00. The transaction was consummated on July 6, 2012.

On July 9, 2012, WPBH changed their format to sports, branded as "The Ticket" (simulcasting WTKE-FM 100.3 FM Niceville, Florida), with new calls WTKP.

On November 5, 2015, WTKP went silent.

On May 1, 2016, WTKP returned to the air simulcasting sports-formatted WTKE-FM "The Ticket".

WTKP became silent in 2019, and any references to the station on their website have since been erased.

Fictional television station and online news site
The call letters WPBH are used in reference to a fictional T.V. station based in Pittsburgh in the 1993 film Groundhog Day.

There is also a website www.wpbh-tv.com that identifies itself as Channel 9 in Pittsburgh, but is not linked to any active station from the city.

Previous logo

References

External links

TKP
1990 establishments in Florida
Radio stations established in 1990